Sports Tonight is an Australian sports news and information program, hosted by Roz Kelly. The original series, which was developed by executive producer Steve Tucker, aired between 1993 and 2011, before it was revived in 2018 and axed again in 2020.

History

Original run 
The show ran from 1993 to 2011. From 1993 until 2005, the show ran for half an hour on each weeknight after Ten Late News. The two shows merged in 2006, but there was some criticism by viewers that Sports Tonight was not long enough, and that it should have remained the same. However, the Friday edition of Sports Tonight remained separate in order to recap that night's football results.

In 2011 the weekend 5:30 pm editions of Sports Tonight normally seen on Network 10 were removed from those timeslots, due to the weekend news bulletins moving to 6 pm. To compensate for this, a Sports Tonight-branded sports report was incorporated into these bulletins. This edition of Sports Tonight had been airing in the 5:30 pm weekend slot since 1999/2000.

Towards the end of its original run, the program was branded as Toyota Sports Tonight. In late 2006, the show was sponsored by Toyota and its upcoming Toyota Aurion, although only minor modifications were done to the on-air graphics to match those of the Aurion colours. In early 2007, the graphics were updated with a heavily sponsored on-air look.

Since March 2009, a weeknightly 9:30 pm edition (started out at 7 pm) of Sports Tonight aired on One with a weekend wrap edition on Sundays. Since 8 May 2011 with the relaunch of One, it aired at around 10:30 pm weeknights (which varies if other programming is on) and at 11:00 pm on Fridays.

In December 2010 Sports Tonight updated their on-air graphics. On 5 July 2011, it was announced that the show would be axed; the show continued to air until just before the conclusion of the football seasons. The final episode aired on 30 September 2011.

Revival 
On 4 July 2018, Network Ten announced that the show would return after a seven-year absence, with Matt White to host alongside panelists Josh Gibson and Laurie Daley. It originally aired weekly on Sunday nights at 9:15 pm from 15 July 2018; however, following the end of the AFL and NRL seasons, the show shifted to a Monday night timeslot. As CBS Studios International had acquired Ten Network Holdings in 2017, the logo and on-air graphics were again updated to a package based around the standardised graphics package and title sequences from CBS Sports that debuted in February 2016 as part of Super Bowl 50.

In March 2019, Network Ten announced that the show would return for 2019 and would be hosted by Roz Kelly alongside panelists Scott Mackinnon and Ant Sharwood. The show aired on Wednesday nights. The final episode was aired on 27 November 2019.

Hosts and panelists 
Roz Kelly (2019)

Panelists 
Scott Mackinnon (2019–present)
Ant Sharwood (2019)

Reporters 
Nick Butler
Lauren Markham

Former hosts 
Tim Webster (first host, 1993–2004) – now on 2CH in Sydney
Bill Woods (alternative host, 1993–2005) – now on Fox Sports Australia
Leigh Diffey (weekend host during 2005 and 2006. Last appeared on Sunday 3 December 2006)
Ryan Phelan (last appeared on Thursday, 21 December 2006)
Mark Aiston (presented on 8 September 2007 due to Brad McEwan, Rob Canning and Neil Cordy being all unavailable, also presented during the 2007–2008 summer period) – now no longer at Network 10
Brad McEwan (Sunday to Thursday presenter between 2007 and 2011)
Matt White (1993–2004, 2018)
Rob Canning – now no longer on television
Neil Cordy (fill-in) – now no longer working in the media

Former panelists 

Josh Gibson (2018)
Laurie Daley (2018)

Former reporters 
 Kelli Underwood – AFL and Senior all sports reporter, including Tennis; based in Melbourne – now at the ABC and Fox Sports Australia
 Amy Hetzel – Producer and reporter; based in Sydney
 Greg Rust – Motorsports reporter; based in Sydney (also motorsports host and commentator)
 Nathan Templeton – Sports reporter
 Aimee McKay – Reporter, based in Sydney and Adelaide. Also hosted 'Seriously Footy' a Sydney Swans and Brisbane Lions AFL show, based in Sydney

Awards 
Sports Tonight had been nominated for the Most Popular Sports Program for the Logies a total of 12 times.

The show was nominated in every year from 1997 until 2010, with the exception of 1999 (not awarded in this year) and 2001 (sports programs included those of the Sydney Olympic Games the previous year).

References

External links
 
 

Network 10 original programming
10 Bold original programming
10 Sport
1993 Australian television series debuts
2011 Australian television series endings
2018 Australian television series debuts
2019 Australian television series endings
Television shows set in New South Wales
Australian television news shows
1990s Australian television series
2000s Australian television series
Australian sports television series
Australian television series revived after cancellation